This is a list of Serbian writers and poets from Serbia, Bosnia-Herzegovina, Montenegro, and former Yugoslav republic Macedonia and diaspore.

A 
Ivo Andrić
Draginja Adamović
Ratko Adamović
Kosta Abrašević
Ratko Adamović
Mira Adanja Polak
Jasmina Ahmetagić
Dejan Ajdačić
Mirko Aksentijević
Danilo Alargić
David Albahari
Mira Alečković
Princess Anka Obrenović
Dragutin Anastasijević
Mika Antić
Slobodan Antonić
Voja Antonić
Milivoj Andjelković
Ljiljana Aranđelović
Eustahija Arsić
Ksenija Atanasijević
Sonja Atanasijević
Nataša Atanasković
Smilja Avramov
Dimitrije Avramović
Predrag Azdejković
Aleksandra Damnjanović D'Agostino
Dušan Andjelković
Branko Andrić-Andrla
Vladimir Andrić
Radmilo Andjelković
Voja Antonić
Vladimir Arsenijević
Ljubica Arsić
Bogoboj Atanacković
Platon Atanacković
Jovan Avakumović

B 
Sava Babić
Dragan Babić
Vladislav Bajac
Đorđe Bajić (novelist)
Ljiljana Bakić
Ilija Bakić
Lujo Bakotić
Jelena Balšić Hranić
Danica Bandić
Anabela Basalo
Đorđe Balašević
Matija Ban
Svetislav Basara
Dušan Bataković
Radomir Belaćević
Aleksandar Belić
Aleksandar Bećić
Matija Bećković
Milan Belegišanin
Jelica Belović-Bernadzikowska
Alen Bešić
Sonja Biserko
Isidora Bjelica
Mirjana Bjelogrlić-Nikolov
Marina Blagojević
Sava Bjelanović
Isidora Bjelica
Mirjana Bobić-Mojsilović
Lazar Bogdanović
Zoran Bognar
Marina Bojić
Milutin Bojić  
Bogdan Bogdanović           
Milan Bogdanović
Valtazar Bogišić
Dragoslav Bokan
Vane Bor (Surrealist)
Radojica Bošković
Đorđe Branković (count)
Dragomir Brajković
Scribe Bratko
Deyan Ranko Brashich
Jevrem Brković
Dragomir Brzak
Timothy John Byford
Dragomir Brajković
Đorđe Branković
Radoslav Bratić
Lukrecija Bogašinović Budmani
Vladimir Bulatović Vib
Miodrag Bulatović
Marina Blagojević
Laslo Blašković
Vanja Bulić
Irinej Bulović
Milica Bodrožić
Zoran Božović
B. D. Benedikt

C 
Elizabeth Christitch
Annie Christitch
Grigorije Camblak
Voja Carić
Milica Cincar Popović
Branislav Crnčević
Branislav Crnčević
Miloš Crnjanski
Brana Cvetković

Č 
Mirjana Čiplić Kuruzović
Melko Čingrija
Prokopije Čokorilo
Aleksandar Čotrić

Ć 
Ivo Ćipiko
Zoran Ćirić
Jovan Ćirilov
Zoran Ćirić
Jelena Ćirić
Dejan Ćirjaković
Olivera Ćirković
Dragan Ćirjanić
Gordana Ćirjanić
Branko Ćopić
Jelena Skerlić-Ćorović
Svetozar Ćorović
Bora Ćosić
Branimir Ćosić
Dobrica Ćosić
Dragomir Ćulafić
Gordana Ćulibrk
Slobodan Ćurčić
Milan Ćurčin

D 
Jelena Damjanović
Ratomir Damjanović
Svetozar Damjanović
Božidarka Kika Damjanović-Marković
Danilo II, Serbian Archbishop
Danilo III
Goran Daničić
Danilo's anonymous pupil
Milovan Danojlić
Oskar Davičo (Surrealist)
Filip David
Ferenc Deák
Milan Dedinac
Dimitrije Dedinac (see Mladen Dimitrijević)
Draga Dejanović
Mihajlo Dejanović
Jovan Delić
Mirko Demić
Jovan Deretić
Vladan Desnica (Surrealist)
Vojislav D. Dević (1952)
Mladen Dimitrijević (Surrealist)
Vojin Dimitrijević
Zija Dizdarević
Arsen Diklić
Moma Dimić
Mladen Dimitrijević, nom de plume of Dimitrije Dedinac
Ratko Dmitrović
Dragutin Dobričanin
Vladan Dobrivojević
Radoje Domanović
Domentijan
Jovan Došenović
Slavka Drašković
Rajna Dragićević
Adam Dragosavljević
Vuk Drašković
Labud Dragić
Predrag Dragić
Rade Drainac
Mladen Dražetin
Jovan Dučić
Dragojlo Dudić
Todor Dutina
Milan Dvornić
Dragomir Dujmov

Dž 
 Petar Džadžić

Đ or Dj 
Ivan Đaja
Gordana Đilas
Gojko Đogo
Dejan Đorđević
Jovan Đorđević
Bojan Đorđević
Bora Đorđević
Branivoj Đorđević
Ljubomir Đukić
Jelena Đurović
Bora Đorđević
Časlav Đorđević
Mirko Đorđević
Momčilo Đujić
Antonije Đurić
Ivan Đurić
Jelena Đurović

E 
Dobrica Erić

F 
Dragan R. Filipović
Helen Losanitch Frothingham
Oskar Freysinger
Vukašin Filipović

G 
Vladimir Gaćinović
Ilija Garašanin
Milo Gligorijević
Milovan Glišić
Ivan Glišić
Zoran Gluščević
Goran Gocić
Vesna Goldsworthy
Jovan Grčić Milenko
Slavomir Gvozdenovici
Zorka Grandov
Milan Grol
Elder Grigorije
Nikanor Grujić
Frano Getaldić-Gundulić
R. M. Guéra

H 
Ljiljana Habjanović Đurović
Ivana Hadži-Popović
Dragan Hajduković
Maja Herman Sekulić
Olga Humo
Slavoljub Hadži Tančić
Šandor Hartig
Jasmina Holbus
Oto Horvat
Jovan Hristić

I 
Violeta Ivković
Ljubica Ivošević Dimitrov
Jakov Ignjatović
Dragutin Ilić
Vojislav Ilić Mlađi
Branislava Ilić
Jovan Ilić
Vojislav Ilić
Miroslav Ilić (Bilje)
Antonije Isaković
Ivan Ivanić
Ivan Ivanji
Pavle Ivić

J 
Оliver Janković
Jefrem Janković Tetovac
Milorad Janković
Zorica Jevremović
Marica Josimčević
Stevan Jakovljević
Đura Jakšić
Mileta Jakšić
Zoran Jakšić
Jefimija
Jefrem
Milica Jeftimijević-Lilić
Milosav Jelić
Vojin Jelić
Zorica Jevremović
Darinka Jevrić
Atanasije Jevtić
Dragoljub Jeronić
Vladeta Jerotić
Dobroslav Jevđević
Miroslav Josić-Višnjić
Biljana Jovanović
Đorđe Jovanović (Surrealist)
Lazar Jovanović
Ljubiša Jovanović
ljubomir Jovanović
Rade Jovanović (singer)
Vladimir Jovanović
Vojislav V. Jovanović
Ranko Jovovć
Proka Jovkić
Aleksandar Jugović
Jelena Dimitrijević
Dragan Jeremić
Vladeta Jerotić
Miroslav Josić Višnjić
Jovan Vujošević
Slobodan Jovanović
Vojislav Jovanović
Boško Jovičić

K 
Dragoš Kalajić
Nataša Kandić
Mina Karadžić
Olivera Katarina
Irena Kazazić
Mihajlo Kažić
Tamara Kučan
Dragoš Kalajić
Momo Kapor
Avdo Karabegović Hasanbegov
Avdo Karabegović
Srđan Karanović
Vojislav Karanović
Miroslav Karaulac
Radovan Karadžić
Vuk Karadžić
Milan Kašanin
Nikola Kašiković
Stoja Kašiković
Dejan Katalina
Vladimir Kecmanović
Drago Kekanović
Ivan Klajn
Petar Kočić
Milan Komnenić
Đorđe Kostić (Surrealist)
Laza Kostić
Slobodan Kostić
Zlatko Krasni
Zdravko Krstanović
Miodrag Kojadinović
Nikola Koljević
Lazar Komarčić
Konstantin Filozof
Radomir Konstantinović
Dušan Kostić
Đorđe Kostić
Erih Koš
Božidar Kovaček
Ivan Kovačević (antropolog)
Gordana Kuić
Slobodan Kušić
Milan Kujundžić Aberdar

L 
Vladana Likar-Smiljanić
Dragan Lakićević
Ivan V. Lalić
Mihailo Lalić
Vojislava Latković
Anđela Lazarević
Jelena Lazarević
Laza Lazarević
Petar Lazić
Stefan Lazarević
Vladimir Lazović
Paulina Lebl-Albala
Đorđe Lebović
Jelena Lengold
Vladana Likar-Smiljanić
Đorđe Lobačev
Jelena Lozanić (see Helen Losanitch Frothingham
Vojislav Lubarda
Tamara Lujak
Dragan Lukić
Svetlana Lukić
Stevan M. Luković
Miroslav Lukić
Svetlana Lukić

Lj 
Draga Ljočić
Stjepan Mitrov Ljubiša

M 
Desanka Maksimović
Smilja Marjanović-Dušanić
Mihailo Marković
Ana Marija Marović
Savo Martinović
Veselin Masleša
Dušan Matić (Surrealist)
Princess Milica of Serbia
Milutin Milanković
Ognjenka Milićević
Miloš S. Milojević
Nikola Milošević (politician)
Branislav "Branko" Milovanović
Nadežka Mosusova
Zorica Mršević
Mara Đorđević-Malagurski
Djordje Maletić
Todor Manojlović
Đorđe Marković Koder
Đorđe Magarašević
Maga Magazinović
Georgije Magarašević
Kosta Majkić
Aleksandar Mandić (editor)
Svetislav Mandić
Ilija Marinković
Mladen Markov
Pavle Marković Adamov
Bogislav Marković
Radovan Beli Marković
Igor Marojević
Simo Matavulj
Dušan Matić
Vladan Matijević
Dejan Medaković
Šiško Menčetić
Ljubomir Micić
Milica Mićić Dimovska
Niko Mirošević-Sorgo
Dragoslav Mihailović
Mihajlo Mihajlov
Borislav Mihajlović
Jasmina Mihajlović
Aleksa Mikić
Milovan Miković
Feliks Mileker
Slobodan Mileusnić
Milan Milićević
Ognjenka Milićević
Zlatoje Martinov
Dušan Matić
Vladan Matijević
Milan Mitrović
Borislav Mihajlović Mihiz
Avram Miletić
Milan Milišić
Marko Miljanov
Branko Miljković
Branislav Milosavljević
Branislav Branko Milovanović
Sima Milutinović Sarajlija
Čedomir Mirković
Milorad Mitrović (poet)
Srba Mitrović
Milan Mladenović
Milena Mrazović
Sava Mrkalj
Nikola Musulin
Mir-Jam
Čedomir Mirković
Igor Mirović
Dimitrije Mitrinović
Mitra Mitrović
Jordan Molović
Salmon Monny de Boully
Goran Mrakić
Lukijan Mušicki
Jelena Marinković (1878-1958), writer
Jelena Milojković (1857-1942), writer
Jelisaveta Marković (1868-1953), translator from French, Latin, Norwegian, and English

N 
Momčilo Nastasijević
Dejan Nebrigić
Aleksandar B. Nedeljković
Dušan Nedeljković
Ivan Negrišorac
Matija Nenadović
Ivan Nešić
Božidar Nikašinović 
Svetomir Nikolajević
Danilo Nikolić
Jovan Nikolić (writer)
Jovanka Nikolić
Milica Ninković
Anna Novakov
Mirjana Novaković
Stojan Novaković
Aleksandar Novaković
Duško Novaković
Branislav Nušić

Nj

O 
Dositej Obradović
Téa Obreht
Aleksandar Obrenović (writer)
Princess Anka Obrenović
Đorđe Ocić
Mošo Odalović
Dejan Ognjanović
Vida Ognjenović
Grozdana Olujić
Tomo P. Oraovac
Zaharije Orfelin
Milan Orlić
Vukman Otašević

P 
Jovan Pačić
Nebojša Pajkić
Medo Pucić
Niko Pucić
Vice Pucić
Maria Palaiologina, Queen of Serbia
Milenko Pajić
Joanikije Pamučina
Sima Pandurović
Vladislav Pandurović
Mihajlo Pantić
Žarana Papić
Ratko Parežanin
Milan Paroški
Milorad Pavić
Gordana Petković Laković
Milivoje Pavlović
Miodrag Pavlović
Slaviša Pavlović
Zoran Pavlović
Živojin Pavlović
Radoslav Pavlović (pisac)
Srba Pavlović
Borislav Pekić
Vaso Pelagić
Sava Penčić
Ljubinka Perinac Stankov
Sreten Perović
Muharem Pervić
Stevan Pešić
Zoran Pešić Sigma
Vesna Pešić
Radoslav Petković
Vladislav Petković Dis
Nevenka Petrić
Rajko Petrov Nogo
Petar II Petrović-Njegoš
Rastko Petrović
Boško Petrović
Goran Petrović
Ilija M. Petrović
Milorad Petrović Seljančica
Uroš Petrović
Veljko Petrović (poet)
Zoran Petrović (writer)
Vladimir Pištalo
Mato Pižurica
Tešan Podrugović
Mira Adanja Polak
Branko Ve Poljanski
Vasko Popa
Raša Popov
Đorđe Popović-Daničar
Jovan Sterija Popović
Milan B. Popović
Pavle Popović
Bogdan Popović
Petar Popović (Surrealist)
Vasa Popović
Zoran Popović
Jovan Popović (writer)
Koča Popović (Surrealist)
Milan Popović (songwriter)
Petar Popović
Danko Popović
Konstantin Koča Popović
Jaša Prodanović
Bosiljka Pušić
Radomir Putnik (pisac)
Nevenka Petrić
Dušan Prelević
Jelena Popović (1845-1930), poet
Jelica Petrović-Pomoriščeva (1875-1960), translator

R 
Branko V. Radičević
Stevan Radić
Jovan Radivojević
Dušan Radojčić
Dragan Radovančević
Slaven Radovanović
Vladan Radovanović
Amfilohije Radović
Dušan Radović
Jovan Radulović
Andrija Radulović
Jovan Radulović
Jerotej Račanin
Čirjak Račanin 
Kiprijan Račanin
Teodor Račanin 
Simeon Račanin 
Hristifor Račanin 
Prohor Račanin
Stevan Raičković
Jovan Rajić
Velimir Rajić
Vićentije Rakić
Slobodan Rakitić
Risto Ratković (Surrealist)
Svetolik Ranković
Eva Ras
Old Rashko
Risto Ratković
Marko Ristić (Surrealist)
Ljubivoje Ršumović
Đorđe Rajković
Milan Rakić
Mita Rakić
Jara Ribnikar
Jovan Ristić
Marko Ristić (Surrealist)

S
Baja Saitović-Lukin
Dušan Salatić
Miloslav Samardžić
Adrijan Sarajlija
Meša Selimović
Jovan Skerlić
Jovanka Skerlić(1870-1950), translator
Meša Selimović
Dejan Tiago Stankovic
Anica Savić Rebac
Dubravka Sekulić
Isidora Sekulić
Staka Skenderova
Sofija Skoric
Ružica Sokić
Svetlana Spajić
Biljana Srbljanović
Mirjana Stefanović
Maša Stokić
Baja Saitović-Lukin
Charles Simic
Jelena Đ. Simić (1850-1930), writer
Ljubodrag Simonović
Ljubomir Simović
Ljiljana Smajlović
Dobroslav Smiljanić
Pavle Solarić
Jelena Popović Spasić (1876-1968), writer
Zoran Spasojević
Jela Spiridonović-Savić
Vladimir Stanimirović
Stanoje Stanojević
Dejan Stojanović
Ivan Stojanović
Radosav Stojanović
Mara Stokić
Olivia Sudjic
Jovan Sundečić
Gordana Suša
Slavenko Saletović
Saša Popović Pop
Milisav Savić
Novica Savić
Martin Segon
Slobodan Selenić
Elder Siluan
Ljubodrag Simonović
Jovan Skerlić
Goran Skrobonja
Djoko Slijepčević
Pero Slijepčević
Dušan Spasojević (pisac)
Zoran Spasojević
Spiridon Gopčević
Biljana Srbljanović
Srđan Srdić
Stojan Srdić
Stevan Sremac
Milica Stojadinović Srpkinja
Slobodan Stanišić
Milanka Stankić
Borisav Stanković
Goran Stanković (pisac)
Mirjana Stefanović
Zoran Stefanović
Vidosav Stevanović
Atanasije Stojković
Dejan Stojanović
Radosav Stojanović

Š 
Slobodan Škerović
Milorad Popović Šapčanin
Ilija Šaula
Vojislav Šešelj
Branimir Šćepanović
Miladin Ševarlić
Božidar Šujica
Petar Šarić

T 
Novica Tadić
Živojin Tamburić
Jovan Tanasijević
Darko Tanasković
Ana Tasić
Jasmina Tešanović 
Sava Tekelija
Teodosije Hilandarac
Mirko Tepavac
Steve Tesich
Milosav Tešić
Srđan V. Tešin
Zorica Tijanić
Bogdan Tirnanić
Duśan Duda Timotijević
Aleksandar Tišma
Dana Todorović
Miroljub Todorović
Pera Todorović
Vojislav Todorović
Dejan Tofčević
Novica Tadić
George Vid Tomashevich
Nenad Trajković (poet)
Duško Trifunović
Miroslav Toholj
Dragan Tomić (pisac)
Vasilije Tomić
Kosta Trifković
Duško Trifunović

U 
Ognjeslav Utješenović
Milan Uzelac
Sreten Ugričić
Pavle Ugrinov
Milorad Ulemek 
Milutin Uskoković
Dragan Uskoković

V 
Dušan Vasiljev
Sonja Veselinović
Aleksije Vezilić
Filip Višnjić
Milovan Vitezović
Mihailo Vitković
Vladan Kuzmanović
Dušan Vukajlović
Dragiša Vasić
Vitomir Vasić
László Végel
Vukša Veličković
Dragan Velikić
Nikolaj Velimirović
Vladimir Velmar-Janković
Svetlana Velmar Janković
Gavrilo Stefanović Venclović
Marko Vidojković
Jovan Stefanović Vilovski
Stanislav Vinaver
Čedomir Višnjić
Milovan Vitezović
Nada Vilotijević
Svetozar Vlajković
Gordana Vlajić
Ljiljana Maletin Vojvodić
Nikola Vulić
Duška Vrhovac
Jelena Vučetić
Lazar Vučković
Aleksandar Vučo (Surrealist)
Julijana Lula Vučo (Surrealist)
Nikola Vučo (Surrealist)
Prvoslav Vujcic
Nikola Vujičić
Stojan Vujičić
Joakim Vujić
Jovan Vukadinović (essayst)
Miroslav Vuksanović
Divna M. Vuksanović
Jelena Vukičević
Drenka Willen

Z 
Gerasim Zelić
Pavle Zelić
Jovan Zivlak
Ljubomir Zuković

Ž 
Milka Žicina
Stevan Živanović
Radojica Živanović Noe (Surrealist)
Stojan Živadinović
Nikola Živanović (poet)
Svetlana Živanović
Nina Živančević
Nikola Živković
Branimir Živojinović
Mita Živković
Vasa Živković
Zoran Živković (writer)
Massuka Živojinović

References 

Writers